Montaud is the name of the following communes in France:

 Montaud, Hérault, in the Hérault department
 Montaud, Isère, in the Isère department
 Montaud, commune now in Saint Etienne